The 2010 Waratah Cup (known as the 2010 McDonald's Cup for sponsorship reasons) was the 8th season of the knockout competition under the Waratah Cup name.

The competition featured clubs from all parts of NSW - from Association, NSW State League Division One, NSW State League Division Two, NSW Super League and NSW Premier League competitions.

The winners were Marconi Stallions, their first title.

Preliminary round

Three matches kick started the 2010 McDonald's Cup campaign on Wednesday 31 March after as many as seven games were cancelled due to wet weather conditions that gripped Sydney. In the three matches St George Association based Sans Souci defeated Eastern Suburbs based Association side Pagewood Botany 2–1 in what was a fiercely contested match. State League Two new boys Belmore Hercules had their work cut out but managed to defeat Bankstown Association's Bankstown Sports Strikers 2–1 at Crest while at Seymour Shaw State League Two side Fairfield Wanderers easily disposed of Sutherland Association's Bangor Junior 5–0. Daniel Gonzalez was the hero for the Wanderers after hitting a first half hat-trick while there were also goals from Sanchez and Olvarez.

First round

Second round

Third round

Fourth round

Quarter finals
Five of the quarter finalists were from the New South Wales Premier League, 2 teams from the NSW Super League and 1 team from NSW State League Division One. All games were played on 9 June 2010.

Semi finals

Final

References

External links
 McDonald's Cup homepage

Waratah Cup
War